The 1996–1997 campaign was the 91st season in Atlético Madrid's history and their 62nd season in La Liga, the top division of Spanish football.

Squad
Squad at end of season

Left club during season

Starting 11

Transfers

In
Juan Eduardo Esnáider from Real Madrid
Radek Bejbl from Slavia Praha
Daniel Prodan from Steaua București (January)
Yordi from Sevilla FC
Veljko Paunovic from Marbella
Carlos Aguilera from CD Tenerife

Out
Lyuboslav Penev to UD Salamanca
Fernando Correa to Sevilla FC (on loan)

Competitions

La Liga

League table

Results by round

Matches

Copa del Rey

Round of 16

Quarterfinals

Supercopa de España

1996–97 UEFA Champions League

Group phase- Group B

Quarterfinals

Statistics

Players statistics

See also
Atlético Madrid
1996–97 La Liga
1996–97 Copa del Rey
1996–97 UEFA Champions League
1996 Supercopa de España

References

Atlético Madrid seasons
Atlético Madrid